Bedford is an English toponymic surname which indicates someone from Bedfordshire County, and the name derived from the name of a Saxon monk 'Bede' combined with the old English ford 'a river crossing'. Notable people with the surname include:

Brian Bedford (1935–2016), English actor
Celia Frances Bedford (1904–1959), British artist
David Bedford (1937–2011), British composer and musician

Davis Evan Bedford (1898–1978), British physician
Frances Bedford (born 1953), Australian politician
Francis Bedford (photographer) (1815–1894), English photographer
Francis Donkin Bedford (1864–1954), English book illustrator
Francis Octavius Bedford (1784–1858), English architect
Fred Bedford (1902–1972), English professional footballer 
Gerald Augustus Harold Bedford (1891–1938), British entomologist

Herbert Bedford (1867–1945), British composer, author and artist
Ian Bedford (1930–1966), English cricketer
Jan Bedford (born 1945), Australian gymnast
James Bedford (1893–1967), psychologist and the first person ever cryonically preserved
John Bedford (c. 1720 – 1791),  English iron worker and industrialist
Kodie Bedford, Australian screenwriter
Lou Singletary Bedford (1837–?), American poet, author, editor
Luke Bedford (born 1978), British composer
Mark Bedford (born 1961), English musician, songwriter and composer
Martyn Bedford (born 1959), British novelist and literary critic
Olivia Cajero Bedford (1938-2022), American politician
Paddy Bedford (c. 1922 – 2007), Australian artist
Peter Bedford (born 1947), Australian rules footballer and cricketer 
Sybille Bedford (1911–2006), German-born English writer
Walter Bedford (1879–1939), English cricketer

English-language surnames
English toponymic surnames